Joseph McFadden (born 9 October 1975) is a Scottish actor, best known for his roles in The Crow Road, Sex, Chips & Rock n' Roll, Heartbeat and Holby City. He won the 2017 series of the BBC One series Strictly Come Dancing with professional dance partner Katya Jones.

Biography
The third of four siblings (two older brothers, one younger sister), McFadden was born on 9 October 1975, in Glasgow to Irish immigrants from County Donegal. He was educated at Holyrood R.C. Secondary School in Glasgow, where a drama teacher recognised his talent and recommended him for a part in the ITV Glasgow-based detective show Taggart.

After taking a role in Take the High Road, he then developed his career in the theatre with roles as diverse as Chitty Chitty Bang Bang, Rent and Rainbow Kiss at the Royal Court. He then took roles in television series The Crow Road and Sex, Chips & Rock n' Roll. He played the title role of Aladdin at The Old Vic opposite Ian McKellen and played Dr Jack Marshland in the original series of the Emmy award-winning Cranford. After that he came to national attention playing PC Joe Mason in the ITV Yorkshire-based period drama Heartbeat from 2007 to its finale in 2010.

After that role ended in 2009, he mixed theatre doing National Theatre of Scotland with director John Tiffany and touring in the Alan Ayckbourn play Haunting Julia and the Harvey Fierstein play Torch Song Trilogy playing Ed. He has also starred in such films as The Trouble with Men and Women, Zig Zag Love, Dad Savage and Small Faces.

From January 2014 to December 2017 he had a leading role as Raffaello "Raf" di Lucca in the BBC One medical drama Holby City. The character was killed off in the two part episode "Group Animal".
In August 2017 he was announced as a participant in the fifteenth series of BBC's Strictly Come Dancing, partnered with Katya Jones, eventually winning in the final and claiming the prized Glitterball Trophy.

On 21 January 2019 it was announced that McFadden would appear in the 2019-20 UK tour of Priscilla, Queen of the Desert.

Selected filmography
Strictly Come Dancing (2017)
Holby City (2014–2017, 2020)
Casualty (2009) 
Cranford (2007)
Heartbeat (2007–2010) 
Alien Invasion (2004; short film)
The Trouble with Men and Women (2003)
Harry Potter and the Chamber of Secrets (2002; video game voice actor)
Sparkhouse (2002) 
The Glass (2001)
Sex, Chips & Rock n' Roll (1999) 
Dad Savage (1998) 
Small Faces (1996) 
The Crow Road (1996)
Take the High Road (1990–97)

Theatre
 Oliver Harcourt in The House on Cold Hill, UK Tour, January 2019
Andy in Haunting Julia, UK Tour, August 2012
 Ed in Torch Song Trilogy, Menier Chocolate Factory, London May 2012
 Writer in The Missing, National Theatre of Scotland, Tramway Arts Centre September 2011
 Georg Nowack in She Loves Me, Chichester Festival Theatre 2011
 Caractacus Potts in Chitty Chitty Bang Bang, Edinburgh Playhouse 2006–7
 Finch in How to Succeed in Business Without Really Trying, Chichester Festival Theatre 2005
 Keith in Rainbow Kiss at Royal Court Theatre, London 2006
 John in A Life in the Theatre at Royal Lyceum Theatre Edinburgh 2004
 Claude in 15 Seconds at Traverse Theatre, Edinburgh 2003
 Mark in Rent at Shaftesbury Theatre, London 1998
 Sloane in Entertaining Mr Sloane at Theatr Clwyd, 1997

References

External links

Scottish male film actors
Scottish people of Irish descent
Scottish male stage actors
Scottish male television actors
Scottish male voice actors
Scottish male soap opera actors
Scottish male child actors
Male actors from Glasgow
1975 births
Living people
People educated at Holyrood Secondary School
Strictly Come Dancing winners